The 1994 NSWRL season (known as the 1994 Winfield Cup Premiership due to sponsorship from Winfield) was the eighty-seventh season of professional rugby league football in Australia. Sixteen clubs, including 14 from within the borders of New South Wales plus two from Queensland, competed for the J J Giltinan Shield during the season, which culminated in a grand final match for the Winfield Cup trophy between the Canberra Raiders and the Canterbury-Bankstown Bulldogs.

Season summary

On the first of June, the previous season's premiers, the Broncos played in the 1994 World Club Challenge match in Brisbane against British champions Wigan. Wigan defeated the Broncos 20 to 14 at ANZ Stadium in front of 54,220 spectators. On 14 July the North Sydney Bears were fined $87,000 for breaching the salary cap. In total, twenty-two regular season rounds were played from March till August, resulting in a top five of Canterbury-Bankstown, North Sydney, Canberra, Manly-Warringah and Brisbane who went on to battle it out in the finals. The 1994 season's Rothmans Medallist was North Sydney forward David Fairleigh. The Dally M Award went to Manly-Warringah's five-eighth, Cliff Lyons who was also named as Rugby League Weeks player of the year. 1994 was the last premiership season to be administered by the New South Wales Rugby League. At the end of the season control of the Winfield Cup would be passed on to the Australian Rugby League and re-branded as such, as part of the move to become a more national competition. This season was also the last in the Premiership for future Australian Rugby League Hall of Fame inductee and coach, Mal Meninga. At the end of the 1994 season a squad of players from the NSWRL Premiership went on the 1994 Kangaroo tour.

The grand finals:

  Canberra Raiders vs Canterbury colours.svg Canterbury Bulldogs (Seniors Grade)
  Cronulla Sharks vs  Newcastle Knightss (Reserve Grade)
  Cronulla Sharks vs  Eastern Suburbs Roosters (Under-21s Grade)
The winners in all grades were:

  Canberra Raiders (Seniors Grade)
  Cronulla Sharks (Reserve Grade)
  Cronulla Sharks (Under-21s Grade)

The test match

  Australia vs  France

The State of Origin Series

  Queensland vs  New South Wales

Teams
The lineup of teams remained unchanged from the previous season, with sixteen clubs contesting the premiership, including five inner Sydney-based foundation teams, another six from greater Sydney, two from greater New South Wales, two from Queensland, and one from the Australian Capital Territory. 

Advertising
In 1994 the  League and its advertising agency Hertz Walpole returned to the original 1989 recording of "The Best" by Tina Turner to underscore the season launch ad. Footage had been shot of Turner's performance at the 1993 grand final and a studio bluescreen shoot also took place during that visit ensuring a store of images that could be used in flexible adaptations for the final two years of Turner's association with the competition and the Winfield Cup.

The 1994 advertisement used the performance and superimposed studio footage of Turner into crowd and stadium scenes that replicated the Sydney Football Stadium. The closing scenes of the commercial made it appear that Turner was singing the song high up in the Sydney Football Stadium's stands in front of its identifiable stretched-sail roofing.

Ladder

Ladder progression

Numbers highlighted in green indicate that the team finished the round inside the top 5.
Numbers highlighted in blue indicates the team finished first on the ladder in that round.
Numbers highlighted in red indicates the team finished last place on the ladder in that round.

Finals

Chart

Grand final

The Canberra Raiders were confident in the lead up, despite their one-point loss to the Bulldogs in the major semi-final, and everything played into their hands from the whistle. Canterbury veteran prop Martin Bella dropped the ball from the kick-off and before too long Canberra had posted two tries.

Canberra legend Mal Meninga was given a champion's farewell as his "Green Machine" swamped the Bulldogs. Canberra's Paul Osborne also enjoyed a fairytale day. On the outer for most of the year, Osborne won a reprieve, playing at  after team-mate John Lomax was suspended for a high tackle in the preliminary final against North Sydney. Osborne, playing in his 135th and last career game before retirement, rose to the occasion by setting up the first two Raiders tries in the opening sixteen minutes.

Meninga's 166th and final match for the Raiders ended perfectly when he scored the last try of the day after intercepting a pass from Jason Smith. Meninga then outlasted the cover defence, running almost 40 metres and palming off his opposite  Jarrod McCracken to score the try beside the posts, sending the 42,234 strong crowd at the Sydney Football Stadium into raptures. Despite being a goal kicker for most of his career, Meninga declined to take what would have been an easy conversion of his own try, instead leaving the kick to regular team kicker, Clive Churchill Medallist David Furner.

The Canberra Raiders had claimed their third premiership, amassing the highest score in a grand final since Eastern Suburbs defeated St. George 38-0 in 1975. It was the highest-scoring grand final since 1951 when South Sydney defeated Manly 42-14 (though tries then were worth only three points).Canberra Raiders 36Tries: Nagas 2, Furner, Daley, Nadruku, Croker, MeningaGoals: Furner 4/7Canterbury-Bankstown Bulldogs 12Tries: Williams, HetheringtonGoals: Halligan 2/2

Clive Churchill Medallist: David Furner
Referee: Greg McCallum
Attendance: 42,234 at the Sydney Football Stadium

Player statistics
The following statistics are as of the conclusion of Round 22.Top 5 point scorersTop 5 try scorersTop 5 goal scorers'''

See also
1994 State of Origin series

References

External links
Rugby League Tables - Season 1994 The World of Rugby League''
NSWRL season 1994 at rugbyleagueproject.com
Results: 1991-2000 at rabbitohs.com.au

NSWRL season
New South Wales Rugby League premiership